Linville Creek Bridge is a historic Thacher truss bridge located near Broadway, Rockingham County, Virginia. It was built by the Wrought Iron Bridge Company in 1898. This bridge was formerly identified as a hybrid Whipple, incorporating aspects of both the double-intersection Pratt and the double-intersection Warren. The structure in actuality is a Thacher truss, a hybrid configuration incorporating elements of the Pratt, Warren, Fink, and Bollman trusses that was first patented by Edwin Thacher in 1883. Its unusual configuration and the bewildering number of descriptions that have been applied to it merely reinforce its position as a bridge that is a rare survivor of an uncommon form.

The bridge was listed on the Virginia Landmarks Register in 1977.
The bridge was listed on the National Register of Historic Places in 1978.

See also
List of bridges documented by the Historic American Engineering Record in Virginia
List of bridges on the National Register of Historic Places in Virginia

References

External links

Historic American Engineering Record in Virginia
Road bridges on the National Register of Historic Places in Virginia
Bridges completed in 1898
Buildings and structures in Rockingham County, Virginia
National Register of Historic Places in Rockingham County, Virginia
Wrought iron bridges in the United States
Pratt truss bridges in the United States
Warren truss bridges in the United States